is a Japanese manga artist known for illustrating the manga series of the girls' anime Ojamajo Doremi. In 1981, she won the Kodansha Manga Award for shōjo for Ohayō! Spank.

References

External links

Manga artists
Winner of Kodansha Manga Award (Shōjo)
Living people
Year of birth missing (living people)